Cryosophila kalbreyeri is a species of flowering plant in the family Arecaceae. It is found in Colombia and Panama. It is threatened by habitat loss.

The plant is named after the Victorian plant collector, Guillermo Kalbreyer (1847 – 1912).

References

kalbreyeri
Flora of Colombia
Flora of Panama
Near threatened plants
Taxonomy articles created by Polbot
Taxa named by Max Burret